The 2014–15 season was Livingston's second season in the  Scottish Championship and their fourth consecutive season in the second-tier of Scottish football, having been promoted from the Scottish Second Division during the 2010–11 season. Livingston also competed in the Challenge Cup, League Cup and the Scottish Cup.

Summary

Management
Livingston began the 2014–15 season under the management of John McGlynn who had been appointed in September 2013. On the 16 December, McGlynn left his position as manager by way of ‘mutual consent’ and was replaced by Mark Burchill in a player/manager role. Off the field, Livingston had been deducted 5 points by the SPFL in November 2014 due to a breach in tax payments and were only spared from relegation on the final day of the season with a home victory over Queen of the South.

Results and fixtures

Pre Season

Scottish Championship

Scottish Challenge Cup

Scottish League Cup

Scottish  Cup

Player statistics

|-
|colspan="12"|Players who left the club during the 2014–15 season
|-

|}

Team Statistics

League table

Division summary

Transfers

Players in

Players out

See also
List of Livingston F.C. seasons

References

Livingston
Livingston F.C. seasons